Masculine virile is an issue relating to verbs and/or nouns in some languages, such as Polish, which refer to male humans but not male animals. They are therefore not to be confused with mere animacy.

Example
In Polish one would say to a group of animals, girls or adult women "Co zrobiłyście?" ("What did you do?"), but "Co zrobiliście?" to a group of boys or men.

References

Grammar